Tanya Bröring (born 25 December 1984) is a Dutch basketball player, currently playing for Loon Lions of the Vrouwen Basketball League (VBL). She is a member of the Dutch national team.

References

1984 births
Living people
Dutch women's basketball players
Dutch expatriate basketball people in Spain
Dutch expatriate basketball people in Germany
Dutch expatriate basketball people in France
Dutch expatriate basketball people in Italy
Sportspeople from Leiden
Point guards